The 2017 WNBA season was the 18th season for the Seattle Storm of the Women's National Basketball Association. The season began May 13 and ended September 3.

Transactions

WNBA Draft

Trades
 Carolyn Swords was acquired from the New York Liberty.
 Washington Mystics traded  its 2017 2nd round draft pick.

Roster

Game log

Preseason 

|- style="background:#bbffbb;"
| 1
| May 3
| Phoenix
| W 86-64
| Loyd (14)
| Swords (8)
| O'Neill (5)
| KeyArena  4,128
| 1-0
|- style="background:#fcc;"
| 2
| May 7
| Phoenix
| L 55-72
| Loyd (13)
| Loyd (5)
| O'Hea (4)
| Talking Stick Resort Arena  4,088
| 1-1

Regular season

|- style="background:#fcc;"
| 1
| May 13
| Los Angeles
| L 68-78
| Loyd (25)
| Langhorne (6)
| Quinn (8)
| Staples Center  10,603
| 0-1
|- style="background:#bbffbb;"
| 2
| May 14
| Indiana
| W 87-82
| Loyd (27)
| Tied (7)
| Tied (3)
| KeyArena  7,969
| 1-1
|- style="background:#bbffbb;"
| 3
| May 21
| Washington
| W 81-71
| Loyd (26)
| Tied (5)
| Bird (10)
| KeyArena  6,088
| 2-1
|- style="background:#bbffbb;"
| 4
| May 26
| New York
| W 87-81
| Stewart (20)
| Stewart (12)
| Tied (6)
| KeyArena  5,860
| 3-1
|- style="background:#bbffbb;"
| 5
| May 28
| Indiana
| W 94-70
| Clark (22)
| Stewart (9)
| Bird (8)
| KeyArena  4,722
| 4-1

|- style="background:#fcc;"
| 6
| June 3
| Minnesota
| L 77-100
| Tied (16)
| Stewart (6)
| Bird (8)
| KeyArena  7,576
| 4-2
|- style="background:#bbffbb;"
| 7
| June 6
| San Antonio
| W 85-76
| Stewart (22)
| Stewart (8)
| Bird (9)
| AT&T Center  4,260
| 5-2
|- style="background:#fcc;"
| 8
| June 9
| Indiana
| L 80-83
| Loyd (25)
| Stewart (9)
| Bird (6)
| Bankers Life Fieldhouse  6,166
| 5-3
|- style="background:#fcc;"
| 9
| June 11
| New York
| L 86-94
| Stewart (23)
| Stewart (10)
| Bird (10)
| Madison Square Garden  8,564
| 5-4
|- style="background:#fcc;"
| 10
| June 13
| Atlanta
| L 86-91
| Loyd (27)
| Langhorne (10)
| Stewart (6)
| KeyArena  4,352
| 5-5
|- style="background:#bbffbb;"
| 11
| June 18
| San Antonio
| W 75-57
| Stewart (22)
| Stewart (15)
| Bird (9)
| KeyArena  9,686
| 6-5
|- style="background:#fcc;"
| 12
| June 23
| Phoenix
| L 82-85
| Stewart (21)
| Stewart (8)
| Bird (8)
| KeyArena  7,796
| 6-6
|- style="background:#fcc;"
| 13
| June 27
| Washington
| L 70-100
| Langhorne (15)
| Stewart (7)
| Bird (5)
| Verizon Center  7,337
| 6-7
|- style="background:#fcc;"
| 14
| June 29
| Connecticut
| L 86-96
| Stewart (22)
| Stewart (10)
| Bird (5)
| Mohegan Sun Arena  8,668
| 6-8

|- style="background:#bbffbb;"
| 15
| July 1
| Dallas
| W 89-69
| Stewart (30)
| Stewart (10)
| Bird (8)
| College Park Center  4,038
| 7-8
|- style="background:#fcc;"
| 16
| July 6
| New York
| L 70-79
| Stewart (20)
| Stewart (14)
| Stewart (5)
| KeyArena  4,397
| 7-9
|- style="background:#bbffbb;"
| 17
| July 8
| Los Angeles
| W 81-69
| Stewart (26)
| Tied (7)
| Tied (4)
| KeyArena  7,104
| 8-9
|- style="background:#fcc;"
| 18
| July 12
| Connecticut
| L 79-83
| Stewart (22)
| Stewart (8)
| Bird (7)
| KeyArena  10,833
| 8-10
|- style="background:#bbffbb;"
| 19
| July 15
| Atlanta
| W 90-84
| Stewart (24)
| Stewart (9)
| Bird (7)
| KeyArena  6,993
| 9-10
|- style="background:#fcc;"
| 20
| July 18
| Chicago
| L 83-94
| Stewart (25)
| Stewart (11)
| Bird (9)
| KeyArena  8,358
| 9-11
|- style="background:#fcc;"
| 21
| July 25
| Los Angeles
| L 60-68
| Stewart (23)
| Langhorne (10)
| Tied (5)
| Staples Center  10,012
| 9-12
|- style="background:#bbffbb;"
| 22
| July 28
| Dallas
| W 109-93
| Loyd (27)
| Stewart (9)
| Bird (6)
| KeyArena  7,797
| 10-12
|- style="background:#fcc;"
| 23
| July 30
| Minnesota
| L 82-93
| Loyd (26)
| Langhorne (10)
| Tied (6)
| Xcel Energy Center  12,432
| 10-13

|- style="background:#fcc;"
| 24
| August 4
| Dallas
| L 80-93
| Loyd (23)
| Tied (5)
| Bird (7)
| College Park Center  3,712
| 10-14
|- style="background:#fcc;"
| 25
| August 5
| San Antonio
| L 80-87 (OT)
| Stewart (32)
| Tied (8)
| Loyd (7)
| AT&T Center  5,869
| 10-15
|- style="background:#fcc;"
| 26
| August 8
| Connecticut
| L 71-84
| Stewart (17)
| Clark (10)
| Bird (4)
| Mohegan Sun Arena  7,853
| 10-16
|- style="background:#bbffbb;"
| 27
| August 12
| Phoenix
| W 98-89
| Tied (20)
| Stewart (9)
| Tied (5)
| Talking Stick Resort Arena  11,797
| 11-16
|- style="background:#bbffbb;"
| 28
| August 16
| Minnesota
| W 62-61
| Loyd (16)
| Stewart (11)
| Quinn (5)
| KeyArena  7,876
| 12-16
|- style="background:#bbffbb;"
| 29
| August 18
| San Antonio
| W 79-78
| Stewart (22)
| Stewart (9)
| Bird (6)
| KeyArena  9,686
| 13-16
|- style="background:#bbffbb;"
| 30
| August 20
| Chicago
| W 103-66
| Stewart (19)
| Stewart (9)
| Bird (8)
| Allstate Arena  6,020
| 14-16
|- style="background:#fcc;"
| 31
| August 23
| Atlanta
| L 83-89
| Stewart (18)
| Langhorne (10)
| Bird (6)
| McCamish Pavilion
| 14-17
|- style="background:#fcc;"
| 32
| August 27
| Phoenix
| L 71-75
| Loyd (33)
| Stewart (9)
| Stewart (4)
| KeyArena  13,882
| 14-18

|- style="background:#fcc;"
| 33
| September 1
| Washington
| L 106-110
| Clark (20)
| Stewart (13)
| Bird (6)
| Capital One Arena11,567
| 14-19
|- style="background:#bbffbb;"
| 34
| September 3
| Chicago
| W 85-80
| Stewart (29)
| Langhorne (12)
| Quinn (7)
| Allstate Arena7,199
| 15-19

Playoffs

|- style="background:#fcc;"
| 1
| September 6
| Phoenix
| L 69-79
| Stewart (23)
| Stewart (8)
| Bird (5)
| Wells Fargo Arena  5,764
| 0-1

Awards and honors

Standings

Playoffs

References

External links
THE OFFICIAL SITE OF THE SEATTLE STORM

Seattle Storm seasons
Seattle
2017 in sports in Washington (state)
Storm